The 2019  Women's PSA World Series Finals was be the first women's edition of the PSA World Tour Finals (Prize money : $160,000) after the renaming of PSA World Series. The top 8 players in the 2018–19 PSA World Tour are qualified for the event. The event take place at Mall of Arabia, Cairo in Egypt from 9–14 June 2019.

It will be the first edition under the PSA World Tour Finals label after the PSA renamed PSA World Series to current PSA World Tour Finals. CIB sponsored the event.

Egyptian Raneem El Weleily won its first PSA Finals title after defeating unexpected french finalist Camille Serme 3–2 in the Final. El Weleily went 2–0 down, but managed to turn it around to win 3–2

PSA World Ranking Points
PSA also awards points towards World Ranking. Points are awarded as follows:

Match points distribution
Points towards the standings are awarded when the following scores:

Qualification & Seeds

Qualification
Top eight players at 2018–19 PSA World Tour standings qualifies to Finals.

Seeds

Group stage results
Times are Eastern European Time (UTC+02:00). To the best of three games.

Group A

Standings

Group B

Standings

Knockout stage

Semifinal
To the best of three games.

Final
To the best of five games.

See also
2019 Men's PSA World Tour Finals
2018–19 PSA World Tour Finals
PSA World Tour Finals
2018–19 PSA World Tour

References

External links
PSA World Tour Finals at PSA website
PSA World Tour Finals official website

W
PSA World Tour Finals
PSA World Tour Finals